Andrea Elisabeth Rudolph (born 1 July 1976 in Vejen) is a Danish TV and radio host. She was previously a co-host in the morning show Morgenhyrderne on Radio 100FM along with Lasse Rimmer and Lars Hjortshøj. She resigned in March 2006.

In 2005, she co-hosted the first two seasons of TV show Vild med Dans with Peter Hansen. Due to pregnancy, Rudolph did not return for the third season in 2006. She joined season 3 host Claus Elming for Vild med Dans fourth season in 2007 as a replacement, replacing her season 3 replacement Christine Lorentzen. She and Elming returned for season 5 and 6. On 22 June 2010, it was announced that Rudolph had left her position as co-host and was replaced by Christiane Schaumburg-Müller. She returned for one episode of the ninth season in 2012. She did some presenting on TV2 in 2021.

She was voted "Babe of the year 2004" by the readers of "Se og Hør", a Danish tabloid.

References

External links
 

1976 births
Living people
Danish television presenters
Danish women television presenters
Danish radio presenters
Danish women radio presenters
People from Vejen Municipality